The April Laws, also called March Laws, were a collection of laws legislated by Lajos Kossuth with the aim of modernizing the Kingdom of Hungary into a  parliamentary democracy,  nation state. The imperative program included Hungarian control of its popular national guard, national budget and Hungarian foreign policy, as well as the removal of serfdom. They were passed by the Hungarian Diet in March 1848 in Pozsony (Pressburg, now Bratislava, Slovakia) and signed by king Ferdinand V at the Primate's Palace in the same city on 11 April 1848. In 1848, the new young Austrian monarch Francis Joseph arbitrarily "revoked" the laws without any legal competence. Hungary did not retain full external autonomy until the Compromise of 1867 which would later influence Hungary's position in World War I. During the negotiations of the Austro-Hungarian compromise in 1867, the April Laws of the revolutionary parliament (with the exception of the laws based on the 9th and 10th points) were accepted by Francis Joseph. In April 1848, Hungary became the third country of Continental Europe (after France (1791), and Belgium (1831)) to enact law about democratic parliamentary elections. The new suffrage law (Act V of 1848) transformed the old feudal estates based parliament (Estates General) into a democratic representative parliament. This law offered the widest suffrage right in Europe at the time.

Twelve Points

The conservativeswho usually opposed most of the reformscould maintain a slim majority in the old feudal parliament, the reformer liberals were divided between the ideas of Széchenyi and Kossuth.
Immediately before the elections, however, Deák succeeded in reuniting all the Liberals on the common platform of "The Twelve Points". The so-called "Twelve Points" of reformers became the ruling principles of the April laws.

References

Hungary under Habsburg rule
Legal history of Hungary
1848 in Hungary
1848 in law
1848